Kosin University is a private Christian university in Busan, South Korea. The name "Kosin" is derived from the name of a denomination of Presbyterian churches in Korea that had organized actions against the Empire of Japan. This university was established in 1946 at the end of Japanese rule in Korea.

Campuses 

Kosin University consists of two campuses: Songdo campus and Youngdo campus.

Songdo campus : Songdo campus is located in Amnam-dong, Seo-gu, Busan.
College of Medicine - Kosin university Gospel hospital is the one of leading hospitals in Korea for cancer treatment. This hospital was established by the famous founder Dr. Chang Kee-ryo.
College of Nursing

Youngdo campus : Youngdo campus is located in Youngdo-gu, Busan.
College of Theology
College of Humanities and Social Sciences
College of Natural Sciences
College of Arts

Notable alumni and students
 Im Ji-kyu, actor

References

Universities and colleges in Busan
Educational institutions established in 1946
Private universities and colleges in South Korea
1946 establishments in Korea